Les Bourgeois is the sixth studio album by Jacques Brel. Also known as Jacques Brel, the album was released on Barclay Records on 15 March 1962. Later, on 4 April 1962, a 10" maxi-single containing of 8 of the album's tracks was released. The same year saw the release of a limited, special edition release of the album that consisted of the original LP with "Jacques Brel" written diagonally across its white cover. This edition was numbered on the front and hand signed on the back.

It was reissued on 23 September 2003 under the title Les Bourgeois as part of the 16-CD box set Boîte à Bonbons by Barclay (980 816-9).

Track listing

 Recorded at Studio Barclay-Hoche in Paris.
 Tracks 1–12 constituted the original 1962 album.
 Tracks 13–14 were added to the album when it was reissued as part of the 16-CD box set Boîte à Bonbons.

Personnel 
 Jacques Brel – composer, vocals
 François Rauber – orchestra conductor
 Jean Corti - bandoneon on "Rosa"
 Gerhardt Lehner – recording engineer & audio mixing (uncredited)
 Jean-Marie Guérin – mastering
 Herman Leonard – photography
 Jean-Pierre Leloir – photography

References 

Jacques Brel albums
1962 albums
French-language albums
Barclay (record label) albums
Universal Records albums
Albums conducted by François Rauber